Pasquale Valentini (born 19 July 1953) is a Sammarinese politician who has held multiple ministerial posts.

Early life
Pasquale was born in San Marino on 19 July 1953. He obtained a high school diploma from San Marino before graduating in mathematics from the University of Bologna in 1977. He is married and has 3 children.

Academic life

Between 1977 and 1993, he worked as a teacher at a junior high school teaching mathematics, Chemistry, Physics and Natural Science. He became the Chair of Mathematics at the upper secondary school in 1993. Between 2004 and 2007 he also served as the director of the district middle school. He was also an active trade unionist having held multiple positions in the Democratic Confederation of San Marino Workers.

Political career
He has been continuously elected to the Grand and General Council since 1988, winning all the elections held since then. He served as the Minister of Education, university and Cultural Institutes from July 2001 to June 2002 and subsequently from December 2002 to December 2003. He was made a member of the party's coordination group in January 2004. He was appointed the party's political secretary in February 2007. He was made the Secretary for Finance with additional charges of Philatelic and Numismatics Division on 30 April 2010. He took over as Foreign Minister with additional charge of Tourism in 2012. Pasquale resigned as the foreign minister in December 2016.

References

1953 births
Living people
Secretaries of State for Foreign and Political Affairs of San Marino
Secretaries of State for Finance of San Marino
Secretaries of State for Education of San Marino
Secretaries of State for Tourism of San Marino
Sammarinese Christian Democratic Party politicians